The Long Journey Home is a 1987 American drama television film starring Meredith Baxter and David Birney (then married to each other), and directed by Rod Holcomb.

It aired on CBS as one of their Sunday Movies, on November 29, 1987, and was the fourth most-watched show in the United States for the week, with 18.9 million homes viewing.

References

External links

1987 films
1987 drama films
1980s English-language films
CBS network films
American drama television films
Films directed by Rod Holcomb
Films scored by J. A. C. Redford
1980s American films
English-language drama films